The Rose is the soundtrack to the feature film of the same name starring Bette Midler which was released in 1979.

Background 
Midler performs all the songs on the album, with the exception of the instrumental "Camellia". Apart from the title track, the soundtrack was entirely recorded live and also features concert monologues, with Midler portraying the character The Rose, loosely based on blues singer Janis Joplin. The soundtrack was produced by Paul A. Rothchild, who in fact also had worked with Joplin on what was to become her final album before her death in 1970, entitled Pearl and released posthumously. Midler's portrayal of The Rose, which was her acting debut, earned her an Oscar nomination for Best Actress in 1980 and became the start of her career in movies.

Release and promotion 
The first single to be lifted off the soundtrack was Midler's rendition of Percy Sledge's "When a Man Loves a Woman" which became a moderate chart hit, peaking at #35 on Billboards single chart. The studio-recorded title track (written by Amanda McBroom) which closes the album however became a top 3 hit for Midler, and also a #1 on the Adult Contemporary chart, and today counts as one of her signature tunes. The alternate single version with orchestral overdubs was not included on the actual soundtrack but later appeared on hits compilations like Experience the Divine along with "When A Man Loves A Woman". One track featured in the movie, Bob Seger's "Fire Down Below", was omitted from the album but Midler recorded a second live version of the song later in 1980 for the soundtrack to her concert documentary Divine Madness. "Keep On Rockin'" was the second Sammy Hagar track Midler recorded, his hard rock track "Red" was featured on her 1977 studio album Broken Blossom. The Rose soundtrack also included one song that since its original release has become a mainstay in Midler's live repertoire, Jerry Ragovoy's despairing blues ballad "Stay With Me".

The Rose peaked at #12 on Billboard's album chart in the Spring of 1980, making it Midler's bestselling album since 1973's Bette Midler.

The album was digitally remastered and reissued on CD by Atlantic Records/Warner Music in 1995 but with no bonus tracks.

Track listing
All tracks recorded live unless otherwise notedSide A"Whose Side Are You On?" (Kenny Hopkins, Charley Williams) - 4:30
"Midnight In Memphis" (Tony Johnson) - 3:44
Concert Monologue - 2:22
"When a Man Loves a Woman"  (Calvin Lewis, Andrew Wright) - 5:20
"Sold My Soul To Rock 'N' Roll" (Gene Pistilli) - 3:42
"Keep On Rockin'" (Sammy Hagar, John Carter) - 4:03Side B  
"Love Me With A Feeling" (Hudson Whittaker) - 3:54
"Camellia" (Steve Hunter) - 3:25
Homecoming Monologue - 1:23
"Stay with Me" (Jerry Ragovoy, George David Weiss) - 5:42
"Let Me Call You Sweetheart" (Beth Slater Whitson, Leo Friedman) - 1:35
"The Rose" (Studio recording - album version) (Amanda McBroom) - 3:42

Personnel
 Bette Midler - lead vocalsThe Rose Concert Band 
 Danny Weis - guitar
 David Campbell - string arrangements
 Steve Hunter - guitar
 Mark Leonard - bass guitar
 Robbie Buchanan - keyboards
 Pentti "Whitey" Glan - drums
 Norton Buffalo - harmonica & trombone, backing vocals
 Jerry Jumonville - saxophone
 Mark Underwood - trumpet
 Bill Champlin - background vocals
 Donny Gerrard - background vocals"Love Me With a Feeling" Band 
 Greg Prestopino - acoustic guitar
 Bill Elliott - piano
 Jon Sholle - electric guitar
 Scott Chambers - bass
 Harry Stinson - drums"The Rose" Ensemble'
 Lincoln Mayorga - piano
 Amanda McBroom - harmony vocals

Production
 Paul A. Rothchild - Record Producer, Musical arranger, remixing
 William Gazecki - sound engineer, Associate Producer, remixing
 Bob Leonard - engineer
 Roger Mayer - engineer
 Stuart Taylor - engineer
 John Neal - engineer
 Ed Lever - engineer
 Recorded by: The Enactron Truck
 SMPTE Code Processing by: Canyon Recorders
 Remixed at Elektra Sound Recorders by Bill Gazecki, Paul A. Rothchild
 Concerts recorded live during June & July 1978
 Stephen Innocenzi - remastering (1995 reissue)

Charts

Weekly charts

Year-end charts

Certifications

References

Bette Midler soundtracks
1979 soundtrack albums
Drama film soundtracks
Albums arranged by David Campbell (composer)
Albums produced by Paul A. Rothchild
Atlantic Records soundtracks